Norman Laird (1906 – 28 April 1970) was a medical doctor and unionist politician in Northern Ireland.

Laird studied at the Royal Belfast Academical Institution and the Queen's University of Belfast.  He became a doctor and joined the Ulster Unionist Party (UUP), and chaired its St Anne's branch from 1948 until 1969.  He was awarded an OBE in 1961.

Laird was elected for the UUP in Belfast St Anne's at the 1969 Northern Ireland general election.  In March 1970, he was one of five UUP MPs expelled from the Ulster Unionist parliamentary party for refusing to support the government in a vote of no confidence.  He died the following month.  In the ensuing by-election, his seat was won by his son, John Laird.

References

1906 births
1970 deaths
Alumni of Queen's University Belfast
Medical doctors from Northern Ireland
Members of the House of Commons of Northern Ireland 1969–1973
Officers of the Order of the British Empire
People educated at the Royal Belfast Academical Institution
Ulster Unionist Party members of the House of Commons of Northern Ireland
Members of the House of Commons of Northern Ireland for Belfast constituencies
20th-century British medical doctors